Quinton Hubert Boatswain (born 16 October 1990) is a West Indian cricketer from Montserrat. Boatswain is a right-handed batsman who bowls right-arm fast-medium. He is a member of the Leeward Islands cricket team.

Career
In January 2008, Montserrat were invited to take part in the 2008 Stanford 20/20, whose matches held official Twenty20 status. Boatswain made a single appearance for Montserrat in their preliminary round match against the Turks and Caicos Islands, with Montserrat winning by 9 wickets. He bowled two wicketless overs which conceded 8 runs in the Turks and Caicos Islands innings, while in Montserrat's innings he wasn't required to bat. In 2008 and 2009, he played at Under-19 level for the Leeward Islands, making a total of eight appearances. As of 2012, he was playing minor matches for Montserrat.

References

External links
Quinton Boatswain at ESPNcricinfo
Quinton Boatswain at CricketArchive

1990 births
Living people
Montserratian cricketers
Leeward Islands cricketers